The Marble-Swift was an American automobile manufactured in Chicago, Illinois from 1903 until 1905.

History 
George W. Marble and George P. Swift patented a friction transmission and originally planned to sell it as a stand-alone product. Marble-Swift Automobile Company was formed and built a factory in Chicago to manufacture complete cars and the new transmission. 

The Marble-Swift was a friction-drive runabout with a 16-hp twin-cylinder engine. In 1905 it was enlarged to a four-cylinder 22-hp touring car with the friction transmission, selling for $1,500.

In 1905 Marble-Swift was succeeded by the Windsor Motor Car Company.

References

External Links 
Hemmings Magazine - Marble-Swift Article

Defunct motor vehicle manufacturers of the United States
Veteran vehicles
Brass Era vehicles
1900s cars
Motor vehicle manufacturers based in Illinois
Vehicle manufacturing companies established in 1903
Vehicle manufacturing companies disestablished in 1905
Cars introduced in 1903